Phalmuter is a Spanish heavy metal/hard rock band from Gran Canaria (Canary Islands). It was formed in 2006 by Enrique ("Kikon"), playing the guitar, and Jac, originally a guitarist but now the singer and bassist. In 2008, the band released their first demo, The Stall, containing 3 original songs and a cover of the GWAR song "Sick of You". In 2010 they supported Richie Kotzen and Jaded Sun at the Telde Rock Meeting music festival, followed by support for Barricada. Their second demo, "Break the D*ck", was released in 2010, containing four new songs.

In 2012, they announced a mini-tour around Ireland, visiting Cork, Clonmel, Dublin and Belfast.
They present three new songs during 2020, with three video clips directed by Jac

Band members
 Jac Cabrera - vocals and bass
 Kikon (Enrique Martinez) - guitars
 Ayose Mayor - drums

Discography
 The Stall (EP) - 2008
 Break The D*ck (EP) - 2010
 True Bypass (single) - 2020
 Eternal Losers (single) - 2020
 We Know Why (single) - 2020

References

 https://open.spotify.com/artist/4DDQhFq0WLEkDrcMW6HxVc?si=OYnlaE1iT2qPDiOMogG1Xw

External links
 
 Official YouTube channel

Spanish heavy metal musical groups
Spanish thrash metal musical groups
Musicians from the Canary Islands
Musical trios